The Chinese in Hawaiʻi constitute about 4.7% of the state's population, most of whom (75%) are Cantonese people with ancestors from Zhongshan in Guangdong. This number does not include people of mixed Chinese and Hawaiian descent.  If all people with Chinese ancestry in Hawaiʻi (including the Chinese-Hawaiians) are included, they form about 1/3 of Hawaii's entire population. As United States citizens, they are a group of Chinese Americans. A minority of this group have Hakka ancestry.

History 
Historical records indicated that the earliest presence of Chinese in Hawaii dates back to the late 18th century: a few sailors in 1778 with Captain Cook's journey, more in 1788 with John Meares, and some in 1789 with American trader Simon Metcalfe, who reached Maui from Macao. Visiting the Sandwich Islands in 1794, Captain George Vancouver reported seeing one Chinese resident.

Encouraged by King Kamehameha I, Hawaii exported sandalwood to China from 1792 to around 1843. As a result, Chinese people dubbed the Hawaiian Islands "Tan Heung Shan", roughly "Fragrant Sandalwood Hills" in Cantonese. Between 1852 and 1899, around 46,000 Chinese immigrated to Hawaii. In 1900, the Chinese population in Hawaii was 25,767. More of these migrants were from Fukien and spoke Fukienese rather than Cantonese. An American missionary observing Maui in 1856 found that the primarily Cantonese shopkeepers and Fukienese laborers communicated in the Hawaiian language.

Although many came as laborers for sugar plantations in Hawaii, they concentrated on getting education for their children. When their contracts expired, many decided to remain in Hawaii and opened businesses in areas such as Chinatown.  By 1950 most Chinese American men in Hawaii were educated and held good jobs.  Today 95% of Chinese Americans in Hawaii live in Honolulu.

A significant minority of early Chinese immigrants to Hawaii, and even fewer to the Continental US, were Hakka, and much of the animosity between the Hakka and Punti Cantonese people carried over. In the first half of the 1800s, around 30 percent of Chinese in Hawaii were of Hakka, while only about 3 percent in the West Coast were Hakka.  The largest surge of immigration in that century occurred after an 1876 treaty between the US and Kingdom of Hawaii led to an increased need for labor.

The majority of marriages between Chinese men and European women in Hawaii were between Cantonese men and Portuguese women. Portuguese and other European women married Chinese men. These unions between Cantonese men and Portuguese women resulted in children of mixed Cantonese-Portuguese parentage, called Cantonese-Portuguese. For two years to June 30, 1933, 38 of these children were born, they were classified as pure Chinese because their fathers were Chinese. A large amount of mingling took place between Chinese and European, Chinese men married Portuguese, Spanish, Hawaiian, Caucasian-Hawaiian, etc. Only one Chinese man was recorded marrying an American woman. Chinese men in Hawaii also married Puerto Rican, Portuguese, Japanese, Greek, and half-white women. There was a communal ban on intermarriages between the two groups for the first generation of migrants. In the middle of the 19th century, Hakka immigrants in America were excluded from membership in the Chinese organizations.

Religion 
Prior to the arrival of Christian missionaries in Hawaii, the early Chinese settlers were adherents of Buddhism, Taoism, and Confucianism. Some even blended aspects of native Hawaiian beliefs into their own belief systems.

Today, due to the work of Christian missionaries in the late 19th century and the 20th century, many of the Chinese in Hawaii are adherents of Protestant and Roman Catholic Christianity. Still, about 100 Buddhist and ancestral temples remain.  The minority who adhere to traditional Chinese religions pay pilgrimage to their ancestors annually. However, no accurate statistics of adherents within the Chinese community in Hawaiʻi are available.

List of notable Chinese people from Hawaiʻi 

 Chun Afong
 Daniel K. Akaka
 Joseph Apukai Akina
 Chang Apana
 Brian Ching
 Madison Chock
 Norm Chow
 William K.S. Chow
 Sam Choy
 Kam-Fong Chun
 Gordon Pai'ea Chung-Hoon
 Auliʻi Cravalho
 Hiram L. Fong
 Clayton Hee
 Don Ho
 Hoku Ho
 Kelly Hu
 Jason Scott Lee
 Richard Loo
 Tai Sing Loo
 Agnes Lum
 Carissa Moore
 William S. Richardson
 Logan Tom
 Hinaleimoana Wong-Kalu

See also 

 Filipinos in Hawaii
 Japanese in Hawaii
 Puerto Rican immigration to Hawaii
 Korean immigration to Hawaii
 Chinese immigration to Puerto Rico

References

Further reading

External links 

 Chinese of Hawaii (1929 directory, 2 volumes, full text online)
 Chinese Societies in Hawaii (2008–2009, 86 society descriptions, full text online)
 First Chinese Church of Hawaii
 List of Chinese-Hawaiian surnames
 Miss Chinatown Hawaii

Hawaii
Chinese-American history
 
History of immigration to Hawaii
Chinese emigration
Chinese diaspora in Oceania